Euzophera afflictella is a species of snout moth in the genus Euzophera. It was described by Ragonot in 1887, and is known from Amur in the Russian Far East.

References

Moths described in 1887
Phycitini
Moths of Asia